Kyriakos Mazoulouxis (born 1 May 1997) is a Greek professional footballer who plays as a centre-back for Super League 2 club Kifisia.

Club career

Early years and move to Belgium 
Mazoulouxis began his career at his local amateur club Poseidon Kalamaria. He made the jump to the more prestigious Aris Thessaloniki in the summer of 2013, where he made his senior debut on 10 November 2014, during a Gamma Ethniki match vs. Aris Akropotamos. He then suffered an injury that kept him out for almost 1,5 years, before being fielded once more as a starter during Aris' Gamma Ethniki matchup vs. Vyzantio Kokkinochoma on 17 April 2016.

In July 2016, Mazoulouxis signed a two-year contract with Belgian First Division B side Lierse. He was a regular starter for the Pallieters Reserve outfit, making his senior debut with the club on 6 May 2017 during a 2−1 win vs. Union Saint-Gilloise. In total, Mazoulouxis made 4 senior appearances for Lierse, all during the First Division B Promotion Play-offs.

Ergotelis 
In the summer of 2017, Mazoulouxis was acquired by Greek Football League side Ergotelis, owned by Egyptian businessman Maged Samy, who also owned Lierse at the time. He spent two seasons with the club in the Second Division, fielded as a regular starter. He eventually refused an extension and was therefore waived by the club in the summer of 2019, reportedly joining Superleague side Panionios' training sessions in anticipation of an official move in January. However, a deal was eventually not struck between the player and the club, and thus Mazoulouxis returned to Ergotelis in January 2020.

International  career
Mazoulouxis has represented Greece with the Greek national U-21 football team.

Career statistics

Honours
Aris
Gamma Ethniki: 2015–16

References

External links
 

1997 births
Living people
Greek footballers
Greece under-21 international footballers
Greek expatriate footballers
Greek expatriate sportspeople in Belgium
Expatriate footballers in Belgium
Football League (Greece) players
Aris Thessaloniki F.C. players
Lierse S.K. players
Ergotelis F.C. players
Association football central defenders
Footballers from Thessaloniki